Joseph-Odilon Duval (May 13, 1895 – March 16, 1966) was a Canadian politician.

Born in Saint-Calixte, Quebec, Duval was the member of the Legislative Assembly of Quebec for Montcalm from 1939 to 1944.

References

1895 births
1966 deaths
People from Lanaudière
Quebec Liberal Party MNAs